Liu Fuliang (born 16 November 1985) is a Paralympian athlete from China competing mainly in T46 classification track and field events.

Liu represented his country at the 2012 Summer Paralympics in London, where he competed in three events, the 100 metre relay and his favoured long jump and triple jump. He finished on the podium in all three events, taking the gold medal in both the jump events and was part of the Chinese relay team that took the silver medal. As well as Paralympic success, Liu dominated both the long jump and triple jump events in the T46/47 classification at the World Championships between the Games in London and Rio. He took the gold medal in both the events in the 2013 World Championships in Lyon, and repeated this feat at the 2015 Championship in Doha.

Personal history
Liu was born in Jiangmen, China in 1985. At the age of eleven he lost his left hand whilst playing with firecrackers. After leaving school he was educated at Jiangmen Sports School.

Notes

Paralympic athletes of China
Athletes (track and field) at the 2008 Summer Paralympics
Athletes (track and field) at the 2012 Summer Paralympics
Paralympic gold medalists for China
Paralympic silver medalists for China
Living people
1985 births
Medalists at the 2012 Summer Paralympics
Chinese male sprinters
Chinese male long jumpers
Chinese male triple jumpers
People from Jiangmen
Runners from Guangdong
Paralympic medalists in athletics (track and field)